Gérard Anaclet Vincent Encausse (July 13, 1865 – 25 October 1916), whose esoteric pseudonyms were Papus and Tau Vincent, was a French physician, hypnotist, and popularizer of occultism, who founded the modern Martinist Order.

Early life 

Gerard Encausse was born at A Coruña in Galicia (Spain) on July 13, 1865, of a Spanish mother and a French father, Louis Encausse, a chemist. His family moved to Paris when he was four years old, and he received his education there.

As a young man, Encausse spent a great deal of time at the Bibliothèque Nationale studying the Kabbalah, occult tarot, magic and alchemy, and the writings of Eliphas Lévi. He joined the French Theosophical Society shortly after it was founded by Madame Blavatsky in 1884–1885, but he resigned soon after joining because he disliked the Society's emphasis on Eastern occultism.

Career

Overview
In 1888, he co-founded his own group, the Kabbalistic Order of the Rose-Croix. That same year, he and his friend Lucien Chamuel founded the Librarie du Merveilleux and its monthly revue L'Initiation, which remained in publication until 1914.

Encausse was also a member of the Hermetic Brotherhood of Light and the Hermetic Order of the Golden Dawn temple in Paris, as well as Memphis-Misraim and probably other esoteric or paramasonic organizations, as well as being an author of several occult books. Outside of his paramasonic and Martinist activities he was also a spiritual student of the French spiritualist healer, Anthelme Nizier Philippe, "Maître Philippe de Lyon".

Despite his heavy involvement in occultism and occultist groups, Encausse managed to find time to pursue more conventional academic studies at the University of Paris. He received his Doctor of Medicine degree in 1894 upon submitting a dissertation on Philosophical Anatomy. He opened a clinic in the rue Rodin which was quite successful.

Encausse visited Russia three times, in 1901, 1905, and 1906, serving Tsar Nicholas II and Tsarina Alexandra both as physician and occult consultant. It has been incorrectly claimed that in October 1905, he conjured up the spirit of Alexander III (father of Tsar Nicholas), who prophesied that the Tsar would meet his downfall at the hands of revolutionaries. Encausse's followers allege that he informed the Tsar that he would be able to magically avert Alexander's prophesy so long as Encausse was alive. Nicholas kept his hold on the throne of Russia until 141 days after Papus' death.

Although Encausse seems to have served the Tsar and Tsarina in what was essentially the capacity of a mediumistic spiritual advisor, he was later curiously concerned about their heavy reliance on occultism to assist them in deciding questions of government. During their later correspondence, he warned them a number of times against the influence of Rasputin.

Involvement and influences

Levi, Tarot, and the Kabbalah

"Papus" is the name of a Genius of the First Hour in the Nuctemeron, and is translated in the text as "physician."

1888 Kabbalistic Order of the Rose-Croix

Although Encausse claimed as his "spiritual master" the mysterious magician and healer known as "le Maitre Philippe" (Philippe Nizier), his first actual teacher in the intellectual aspects of occultism was the marquis Joseph Alexandre Saint-Yves d'Alveydre (1842 - 1910). Saint-Yves had inherited the papers of one of the great founders of French occultism, Antoine Fabre d'Olivet (1762 - 1825), and it was probably Saint-Yves who introduced Papus to the marquis Stanislas de Guaita (1861 - 1897).

In 1888, Encausse and de Guaita joined with Joséphin Péladan  and Oswald Wirth to found the Rosicrucian Kabbalistic Order of the Rose-Cross.

1891 l'Ordre Martiniste

In 1891, Encausse claimed to have come into the possession of the original papers of Martinez Paschalis, or de Pasqually (c. 1700-1774), and therewith founded an Order of Martinists called l'Ordre des Supérieurs Inconnus. He claimed to have been given authority in the Rite of Saint-Martin by his friend Henri Vicomte de Laage, who claimed that his maternal grandfather had been initiated into the order by Saint-Martin himself, and who had attempted to revive the order in 1887. The Martinist Order was to become a primary focus for Encausse, and continues today as one of his most enduring legacies.

1893-1895 Bishop of l'Église Gnostique de France

In 1893, Encausse was consecrated a bishop of l'Église Gnostique de France by Jules Doinel, who had founded this Church as an attempt to revive the Cathar religion in 1890. In 1895, Doinel abdicated as Primate of the French Gnostic Church, leaving control of the Church to a synod of three of his former bishops, one of whom was Encausse.

1895 Hermetic Order of the Golden Dawn

In March 1895, Encausse joined the Ahathoor Temple of the Hermetic Order of the Golden Dawn in Paris.

1901 Anti-Semitic writings

In October 1901 Encausse collaborated with Jean Carrère in producing a series of articles in the Écho de Paris under the pseudonym Niet ("no" in Russian). In the articles Sergei Witte and Pyotr Rachkovsky were attacked, and it was suggested that there was a sinister financial syndicate trying to disrupt the Franco-Russian alliance. Encausse and Carrère predicted that this syndicate was a Jewish conspiracy, and the anti-Semitic nature of these articles, compounded by Encausse's known connection to the Tsar of Russia, may have contributed to the allegation that Papus was the author who forged The Protocols of the Elders of Zion.

1908 - 1913 Encausse, Reuss and paramasonry

Encausse never became a regular Freemason. Despite this, he organized what was announced as an "International Masonic Conference" in Paris on June 24, 1908, and at this conference he first met Theodor Reuss, and the two men apparently exchanged patents:

Reuss elevated Encausse as X° of the Ordo Templi Orientis as well as giving him license to establish a "Supreme Grand Council General of the Unified Rites of Ancient and Primitive Masonry for the Grand Orient of France and its Dependencies at Paris."  For his part, Encausse assisted Reuss in the formation of the O.T.O. Gnostic Catholic Church as a child of l'Église Gnostique de France, thus forming the E.G.C. within the tradition of French neo-gnosticism.

When John Yarker died in 1913, Encausse was elected as his successor to the office of Grand Hierophant (international head) of the Antient and Primitive Rite of Memphis and Mizraim.

Death
When World War I broke out, Encausse joined the French army medical corps. While working in a military hospital, he contracted tuberculosis and died in Paris on October 25, 1916, at the age of 51.

Bibliography 

This is a partial list of written works of Papus (Gérard Encausse) include works in French:

 L'Occultisme Contemporain, 1887.  from Gallica
 Le Tarot des Bohémiens, 1889.
 L'Occultisme, 1890.
 Traité méthodique de Science Occulte, 1891. PDF scans from Google Books
 La Science Des Mages, 1892. PDF scans from Gallica
 Anarchie, Indolence et Synarchie, 1894. PDF scans from Gallica
 Le Diable et l'Occultisme. 1895.
 Traité Méthodique de La Magie Pratique, 1898. PDF scans from Gallica
 La Kabbale, 1903.
 Le Tarot Divinatoire, 1909. PDF scans from Internet Archive

With Jean Carrère

Niet (Gérard Encausse and Jean Carrère), La Russie Aujourd'hui. 1902.

Publications (translated in English) 
 The Tarot of the Bohemians, translated by A. P. Morton,  London, George Redway 1896
 The Divinatory Arts, The Three Luminaries, 2020.
 Notebooks of the Order, The Three Luminaries, 2020.
 Inauguration of the Martinist Lodge Velléda, The Three Luminaries, 2020.

References

External links 

T. Apiryon, Docteur Gérard Encausse
Complete bibliography of the writings of Papus (in French).

1865 births
1916 deaths
People from A Coruña
Spanish emigrants to France
French hypnotists
French occult writers
Gnostics
Martinism
Physicians from Paris
Tarotologists
Members of Ordo Templi Orientis
Hermetic Order of the Golden Dawn
Burials at Père Lachaise Cemetery
19th-century occultists